So Matsuda (born 24 September 1999) is a Japanese freestyle skier. He competed in the 2022 Winter Olympics. He currently resides in Nagano.

In 23 World Cup starts, he has two top-10 finishes, his best being sixth in dual moguls (2019 in Thaiwoo) and seventh in moguls (2022 in Deer Valley). He was the 2019 Japanese national moguls champion.

References

External links

1999 births
Living people
Freestyle skiers at the 2022 Winter Olympics
Japanese male freestyle skiers
Olympic freestyle skiers of Japan
Sportspeople from Kyoto
21st-century Japanese people